Elton Santiago dos Santos Lira (born 21 September 1986) is a Brazilian footballer CRB.

External links

Elton Lira at Footballzz

1986 births
Living people
Brazilian footballers
Clube Atlético Juventus players
Czech First League players
FC Zbrojovka Brno players
Brazilian expatriate footballers
Expatriate footballers in the Czech Republic
Expatriate footballers in Poland
Footballers from São Paulo
Association football midfielders